Rafael de Medina y Abascal, 20th Duke of Feria, GE (born 25 September 1978) is the son of the late 19th Duke of Feria and the Spanish top-model Nati Abascal. He belongs to one of the most important families of Spain, the House of Medinaceli, being a grandson of Victoria Eugenia Fernández de Córdoba, 18th Duchess of Medinaceli.

Background 
Rafael studied Finance in Washington and in New York. He subsequently worked for the company Credit Suisse. In 2002, he succeeded his father to the dukedom of Feria at the age of 23, therefore becoming one of the youngest dukes in the Spanish nobility. In 2007 he gave up his job to launch a project named Scalpers, a fashion line for men. Rafael is a celebrated member of the Spanish aristocracy and jet-set, entering the Vanity Fair'''s International Best Dressed List in 2007. He currently resides in Madrid.

Wedding 
The Duke married Laura Vecino de Acha on 16 October 2010.

Ancestry

Titles and styles
Titles
20th Duke of Feria, Grandee of Spain
17th Marquess of Villalba

StylesThe Most Excellent Don Rafael de Medina y Abascal (1978 - 2002)The Most Excellent'' The Duke of Feria (2002 -)

Notes

References
http://www.elmundo.es/cronica/2002/347/1023694982.html
http://www.grandesp.org.uk/historia/gzas/medcel.htm
http://www.geneall.net/H/per_page.php?id=444255
http://www.fundacionmedinaceli.org/casaducal/fichaindividuo.aspx?id=251

|-

1978 births
Living people
120
Rafael
Grandees of Spain
The Kiski School alumni